Diego Fernando Lo Grippo (born January 22, 1978) is an Argentine-Italian professional basketball player. He also holds Italian nationality.

Professional career
Lo Grippo was the Argentine League Finals MVP in 2003.

Pro clubs
1998–2001: Ferro Carril Oeste
2001–2002: Estudiantes de Olavarria
2002–2003: Atenas
2003–2005: Cantabria Baloncesto
2005–2009: Autocid Ford Burgos
2009–2010: Atenas
2010–2013: Quimsa
2013–2014: Libertad de Sunchales
2014–present: Atenas

National team career
Lo Grippo debuted for the Argentina national team in 2003, in a game against Chile.

Argentina national team honours

2003 South American Championship: 
2005 FIBA Americas Championship: 
2005 Stanković Cup: 
2006 South American Championship: 
2007 Pan American Games: (fourth place)
2007 FIBA Americas Championship:

References

External links
Eurobasket.com Profile

1978 births
Living people
Argentine men's basketball players
Atenas basketball players
Basketball players at the 2007 Pan American Games
Estudiantes de Olavarría basketball players
Ferro Carril Oeste basketball players
Italian men's basketball players
Pan American Games competitors for Argentina
Quimsa basketball players
Sportspeople from Rosario, Santa Fe
Forwards (basketball)